Álvaro David Montero Perales (born 29 March 1995) is a Colombian professional footballer who plays as a goalkeeper for Millonarios.

International
Montero made his Colombia national team debut on 3 June 2019, in a friendly against Panama, as a 77th-minute substitute for David Ospina.

References

External links
 Montero at Football Lineups
 

1995 births
Living people
Colombian footballers
Colombia under-20 international footballers
Colombia international footballers
Associação Desportiva São Caetano players
San Lorenzo de Almagro footballers
Argentine Primera División players
Colombian expatriate footballers
2019 Copa América players
Expatriate footballers in Argentina
People from La Guajira Department
Association football goalkeepers